Kentucky held its elections August 3, 1814.

See also 
 Kentucky's 2nd congressional district special election, 1814
 Kentucky's 2nd congressional district special election, 1815
 United States House of Representatives elections, 1814 and 1815
 List of United States representatives from Kentucky

Notes

References 

1814
Kentucky
United States House of Representatives